Chrysolina staphylaea is a species of leaf beetle native to Europe. It has also been found in Eastern Canada, with the first discovery being in Halifax, Nova Scotia in June 1897. The beetle has a reddish-brown body.

References

External links
Images representing Chysolina at BOLD

Chrysomelinae
Beetles described in 1758
Beetles of Europe
Taxa named by Carl Linnaeus